Antonio Ando (born 27 August 1914, date of death unknown) was an Argentine sports shooter. He competed in the 50 m rifle event at the 1948 Summer Olympics.

References

External links
 

1914 births
Year of death missing
Argentine male sport shooters
Olympic shooters of Argentina
Shooters at the 1948 Summer Olympics
Pan American Games gold medalists for Argentina
Pan American Games silver medalists for Argentina
Pan American Games medalists in shooting
Place of birth missing
Shooters at the 1951 Pan American Games
Shooters at the 1959 Pan American Games
Shooters at the 1963 Pan American Games
Medalists at the 1951 Pan American Games